Lennard Hofstede (born 29 December 1994) is a Dutch racing cyclist, who currently rides for UCI WorldTeam . He rode at the 2014 UCI Road World Championships. He was named in the startlist for the 2017 Vuelta a España. In May 2018, he was named in the startlist for the 2018 Giro d'Italia.

Major results

2012
 1st Stage 1 Driedaagse van Axel
 3rd Overall GP Général Patton
 10th Kuurne–Brussels–Kuurne Juniores
2015
 3rd Coppa dei Laghi-Trofeo Almar
 4th Piccolo Giro di Lombardia
 10th Overall Tour des Pays de Savoie
2016
 1st  Overall Rhône-Alpes Isère Tour
1st  Young rider classification
1st Stage 2
 3rd Overall Tour de Bretagne
 4th Liège–Bastogne–Liège Espoirs
 10th Flèche Ardennaise
2017
 5th Overall Danmark Rundt
 9th Overall Tour de Yorkshire

Grand Tour general classification results timeline

References

External links
 

1994 births
Living people
Dutch male cyclists
People from Monster
UCI Road World Championships cyclists for the Netherlands
Cyclists from South Holland